The lex Vatinia (probably passed in May or early June 59 BC) also known as the lex Vatinia de provincia Caesaris or the lex Vatinia de imperio Caesaris, was legislation which gave Gaius Julius Caesar governorship of the provinces of Cisalpine Gaul and Illyricum for five years. It was named after and proposed, in the Tribal Assembly, by plebeian tribune Publius Vatinius. Along with the provinces, it also gave him the three legions already present there and the privilege of naming his own legates. Caesar also received Titus Labienus as legatus cum imperio in the law; Labienus' appointment may have been, according to Syme, a sign of friendship between Pompey and Caesar.

Caesar seemed to want to use the law to prepare for a war of choice against the kingdom of Dacia. However, after the unexpected death of the governor of Transalpine Gaul, and at the proposal of Pompey and Piso, the senate also added to Caesar's assigned provinces the further Gaul as well, giving him another legion. According to Cicero and Suetonius, the senate's assignment was done out of fear that if they did not do so, a tribune would introduce and the people would pass further legislation assigning the province as well.

Impact 

The army assigned to Caesar in Cisalpine Gaul and the provinces close to it would prove both useful in Caesar's civil war and, in the immediate term, for the protection of Caesar's legislative programme against repeal. The law – importantly – gave Caesar, as governor of the provinces, a chance to show his martial quality with great potential for military glory. To that end, he campaigned extensively in Germany, Britain, and Gaul; the selection of the provinces also helped in that the provincial populations were flush with Roman citizens who could be recruited for Caesar's campaigns.

Caesar's position in Transalpine Gaul was annually reviewed by the senate. When the five year term expired, Caesar met with Pompey, Crassus, and others at the so-called Luca Conference where they renewed their political alliance and pushed through legislation to extend Caesar's Gallic commands in their entirety.

The granting of a proconsulship in Gaul also gave Caesar legal immunity against prosecution by his political enemies and a number of armies. While Caesar did not appear to desire a war against his countrymen upon his prorogation pro consule to Gaul and Illyricum, the following Gallic Wars and his subsequent personal popularity, led to a confrontation with the senate and Caesar's decision to go to war to protect his personal interests.

See also 
 Roman law
 List of Roman laws

References 

 Sources 

 
 
 

Roman law